Presidential elections were held in Portugal on 16 December 1918. Following Portugal's 1911 constitution, the Congress of the Republic must elect the president in Lisbon instead of the Portuguese people.

The election was held two days after the assassination of the Portuguese president Sidónio Pais on 14 December 1918. There were a total of 4 candidates. At the first ballot quorum wasn't reached, so the election was repeated, this time with the necessary members present. National Republican João do Canto e Castro won against his opponents and he was elected as the new President of Portugal succeeding the late Sidónio Pais.

Results

References

Portugal
1918 elections in Portugal
1918
December 1918 events